Ust-Labinsky District is an administrative district (raion), one of the thirty-eight in Krasnodar Krai, Russia. As a municipal division, it is incorporated as Ust-Labinsky Municipal District. It is located in the center of the krai. Its administrative center is the town of Ust-Labinsk. Population:  The population of Ust-Labinsk accounts for 38.3% of the district's total population.

References

Notes

Sources

Districts of Krasnodar Krai